Marry Ailonieida Sombán Mari, earlier also known as Mary A. Somby, (born 1953) is a Sami author from Deatnu, Norway.  She wrote the first children's book in one of the Sami languages.

References

1953 births
Living people
People from Tana, Norway
Norwegian Sámi people
Norwegian Sámi-language writers